The 1931 Five Nations Championship was the seventeenth series of the rugby union Five Nations Championship following the inclusion of France into the Home Nations Championship. Including the previous Home Nations Championships, this was the forty-fourth series of the annual northern hemisphere rugby union championship. Ten matches were played between 1 January and 6 April. It was contested by England, France, Ireland, Scotland and Wales.

Shortly after the tournament, France was expelled from the competition amid allegations of professionalism in the domestic game (rugby union was officially an amateur sport until 1995) and perceived administrative deficiencies. France remained expelled until the 1947 competition after the Second World War. They were readmitted later in 1939, but the outbreak of World War II in Europe halted international rugby until 1947.

Table

Results

External links

1931
Five Nations
Five Nations
Five Nations
Five Nations
Five Nations
Five Nations
Five Nations Championship
Five Nations Championship
Five Nations Championship
Five Nations Championship